Corinna Dentoni and Florencia Molinero were the defending champions, but both players chose not to participate.

Nicole Clerico and Anna Zaja won the title, defeating Mailen Auroux and María Irigoyen in the final, 4–6, 6–3, [11–9].

Seeds

Draw

References 
 Main draw

Royal Cup NLB Montenegro - Doubles